La Paglia or LaPaglia is a surname or last name. Notable people with the surname include:

Anthony LaPaglia (born 1959), Australian actor, brother of Jonathan LaPaglia
César La Paglia (born 1979), Argentine football player
Jonathan LaPaglia (born 1969), Australian actor, brother of Anthony LaPaglia

See also
Paglia

Italian-language surnames